Vonarburg is a surname. Notable people with the surname include:

André Vonarburg (born 1978), Swiss rower
Élisabeth Vonarburg (born 1947), French writer